Árpád Szűcs (also known as Arpad Suciu; born 16 March 1943) is a Romanian former professional footballer of Hungarian ethnicity. Szűcs grew up in the youth academies of the historical local clubs Stăruința Oradea (named Metalul Oradea at that time) and Club Atletic Oradea (named CS Oradea at that time). He made his debut in the Divizia B for Crișana Oradea (former CS Oradea), in 1961, under the management of Ferenc Rónay, a legend of the Romanian and Hungarian football. One year later, young Szűcs also made his debut in the top-flight, for the same team, Crișana.

Crișana Oradea was dissolved in 1963 and Árpád Szűcs moved to second-tier club Flamura Roșie Oradea, then in 1964 signed a contract with the best ranked team from the city, Crișul Oradea. He played for 15 years and in more than 300 matches for FC Bihor Oradea (Crișul was renamed as FC Bihor in 1972). In generally, Szűcs played for teams based in his hometown, except the 1973–74 season, season in which he played for Mureșul Deva and Jiul Petroșani, with Jiul also winning the 1973–74 Cupa României, Szűcs scoring the fourth goal of the final.

Árpád Szűcs played in approx. 550 matches (first tier, second tier, cup and friendly matches) and scored 39 goals, from which 190 matches were in the top-flight, division in which he also scored 30 of his goals.

Honours
Crișana Oradea
Divizia B: 1961–62

Bihor Oradea
Divizia B: 1970–71, 1974–75

Jiul Petroșani
Cupa României: 1973–74

References

External links
Árpád Szűcs at labtof.ro
Arpad Suciu at labtof.ro

1943 births
Living people
Sportspeople from Oradea
Romanian footballers
Association football midfielders
Liga I players
Liga II players
Stăruința Oradea players
CA Oradea players
FC Bihor Oradea players
CSM Deva players
CSM Jiul Petroșani players